Jay Gardner Lewis (1914 – June 4, 1969) was a film director, a film producer and writer born in Warwickshire, England. In 1940, he founded the documentary film company Verity Films with Sydney Box.

Filmography

Director
A Home of Your Own starring Ronnie Barker (1964) (and writer credits)
Live Now, Pay Later (1962)
Invasion Quartet (1961)
The Baby and the Battleship (1956) (also writer and producer credits)
Queen's Messengers (1941) (and producer credit)

Producer
Front Page Story (1954) (and writer credit)
Morning Departure (1950) aka Operation Disaster (USA)

Notes

External links

Info on A Home of Your Own
Info on ''The Baby and the Battleship

English film directors
English male screenwriters
English film producers
People from Warwickshire
1914 births
1969 deaths
20th-century English screenwriters
20th-century English male writers
20th-century English businesspeople